Events from the year 1118 in Ireland.

Incumbents
High King of Ireland: Domnall Ua Lochlainn

Events
 Synod of Ráth Breasail
 Enna mac Donnchada mac Murchada becomes King of Dublin.
 Cu Faifne mac Congalaig becomes King of Uí Failghe.
 Maelsechlainn Ua Faelain becomes King of the Déisi Muman.

Deaths
 Diarmait Ua Briain, King of Munster.
 Rogan mac Domnaill meic Conchobair, King of Uí Failghe.

References

Years of the 12th century in Ireland